Derelicts is a 1917 British silent drama film directed by Sidney Morgan and starring Violet Graham, Sydney Vautier and Julian Royce.

Cast
 Violet Graham as Yvonne Latour 
 Sydney Vautier as Stephen Chisely 
 Julian Royce as Canon Chiseley 
 Mona K. Harrison as Annie Bevan 
 F. Yensen as Amedee Bazauge

References

Bibliography
 Goble, Alan. The Complete Index to Literary Sources in Film. Walter de Gruyter, 1999.
 Low, Rachael. The History of the British Film 1914 - 1918. George Allen & Unwin, 1950.

External links
 

1917 films
British drama films
British silent feature films
Films directed by Sidney Morgan
1917 drama films
British black-and-white films
Films based on British novels
1910s English-language films
1910s British films
Silent drama films